The Best of Ronnie Dove Vol. 2 is a 1967 compilation album by pop singer Ronnie Dove.

History
Diamond Records did not issue Dove's then-current single "Dancin' Out of My Heart" on this album, instead deciding to issue its B-side, "Back from Baltimore". According to Dove, Neil Diamond had written the song "Red Red Wine" for Dove to record; however, Phil Kahl turned down the song, claiming Dove had a "teen idol image" he needed to keep. Diamond then wrote "Back from Baltimore" for Dove, since Dove lived there at the time.

Release
The album was issued in both mono and stereo.  There was also a special pressing made for the Columbia Records Club.  It was Dove's final album for Diamond Records, and the last album Diamond ever released.  Dove continued to issue singles on the label until it closed in early 1970.

Track listing

References

Ronnie Dove albums
1967 compilation albums